Gebze Teknik Üniversitesi – Fatih station is a station on the Marmaray commuter rail line in Gebze, Turkey. The station, along with Çayırova, is situated inside the Gebze Technical University campus. Commuter rail service resumed on 13 March 2019.

References

External links
Station information

Railway stations in Kocaeli Province
Railway stations opened in 1992
1992 establishments in Turkey